Thumb Rock is a rock lying between Winter Island and the northwest end of Galindez Island in the Argentine Islands, Wilhelm Archipelago. Charted and named in 1935 by the British Graham Land Expedition (BGLE) under Rymill.

Rock formations of the Wilhelm Archipelago